Servette FC Chênois Féminin  is a women's football club from Geneva, Switzerland. Its first team plays in the top tier in Switzerland and in UEFA Champions League.

History 
Servette FC Chênois was founded in 1974 as the women's section of Club Sportif Chênois, named for the Chêne area. In 2012, it was spun off from the original club and rebranded under the name Football Féminin Chênois Genève. In 2017, the team was combined with Servette FC and renamed Servette FC Chênois Féminin.

In 2018, the club was promoted for the first time in National League A and reached the 4th rank. The next season, when the tournament had to be stopped due to COVID-19, Servette was standing at the first rank, and was therefore qualified for 2020–21 Champions League. The club reached the round of 32 and was eliminated by Atlético Madrid.

Servette FC Chênois won their first Super League title in the 2020–21 season.

Titles 
 Swiss Women's Super League (1) : 2020–21
 National League B: 2013

Current squad

See also 
 Servette FC
 Swiss Women's Super League

References 

Women's football clubs in Switzerland
1974 establishments in Switzerland
Association football clubs established in 1974